Sport Vereniging Jong Aruba (English:Sports Club) (known as SV Jong Aruba) or simply Jong Aruba is an Aruban football club based in Noord, which currently play in Aruba's second division, Division Uno.

Achievements
Aruban Division Uno: 3
1967-68, 2000, 2015–16

Players

Current squad
As of 28 October 2022

External links
Jong Aruba Official website 
Facebook page 
Division Uno

References

Estudiantes